Oliver Henry Moors (born 24 September 1996) is a British professional road and track cyclist, who currently rides for Belgian amateur team Borgonjon–Dewasport. He has won five national titles in his specialist discipline and has represented Great Britain at the 2016 and 2017 UEC European Derny Championships. Moors also previously rode for the professional American UCI Continental team,  in 2016.

Major results

2015
 National Track Championships
1st  Derny
9th Scratch
2016
1st  Derny, National Track Championships
2nd UIV U23 Cup, Gent
6th Derny, UEC European Track Championships
2017
1st  Derny, National Track Championships
8th Derny, UEC European Track Championships
2018
1st  Derny, National Track Championships
2019
1st  Derny, National Track Championships

References

External links

Oliver Moors at astellascycling.com

British male cyclists
Living people
1996 births
Place of birth missing (living people)